The Norway national under-19 football team, controlled by the Football Association of Norway, is the national football team of Norway for players of 19 years of age or under at the start of a UEFA European Under-19 Football Championship campaign.

Competitive record

UEFA European Under-19 Football Championship record

Players

Current squad 
 The following players were called up for the 2023 UEFA European Under-19 Championship qualification matches.
 Match dates: 22, 25 and 28 March 2023
 Caps and goals correct as of:''' 19 November 2022, after the match against .

Recent call-ups 
The following have been called up within the last twelve months and remain eligible for future selection.

References

External links 
 UEFA Under-19 website Contains full results archive

European national under-19 association football teams
under-19